Marcel Regamey (1905–1982) was a Swiss essayist and journalist from the Canton of Vaud.

Works
 La protection de la personnalité en droit civil : essai de critique et de synthèse, 1929
Dans les cahiers Ordre et Tradition, publiés à Lausanne :
 L'ordre dans l'État, No 1, 1926
 Esquisse d'un régime d'intérêt national, No 9, 1929
 Essai sur le Gouvernement personnel, No 12, 1931
Dans les Cahiers de la Renaissance vaudoise, publiés à Lausanne :
 Les problèmes de l'histoire vaudoise, No 14 et No 15, 1935
 Propriété et liberté, No 29, 1946
 Action libre, déterminisme moral et plan providentiel, No 30–31, 1948
 Le Mythe du Golfe, No 36, 1960
 La gauche et la droite, No 50, 1968
 Évangile et politique, No 85, 1973
 La consécration de la Cathédrale de Lausanne le 19 octobre 1275 et l'unité de l'Europe chrétienne, No 87, 1975, et Lausanne, Centre de recherches européennes, 1975
 Études fédéralistes, No 95, 1978, pp. 41–61 : "Le fédéralisme vaudois"
 Par quatre chemins, No 100, 1980
 La formation de l'État dans les six cantons romands, No 104, 1982
 La plume de Marcel Regamey, Articles de La Nation (1931-1982), choisis sous la direction de Philibert Muret, No 117, 1989

Bibliography 
 William Hentsch (dir.),  Le chemin de Marcel Regamey, Sa vie, ses écrits, son action, Cahiers de la Renaissance vaudoise, No 116, 1989 (illustrations, index, bibliographie)
 Jean-Jacques Langendorf, Monarchie, politique et théologie chez Marcel Regamey, suivi du discours prononcé lors de la réception du Prix Michel Dentan, Cahiers de la Renaissance vaudoise, No 137, 2001 ; paru aussi dans le Bulletin Charles Maurras, n°13
 Roland Butikofer, Le refus de la modernité, La Ligue vaudoise: une extrême droite et la Suisse (1919-1945), Payot, Lausanne, 1996 (thèse), 
 Françoise Fornerod, Lausanne, Le temps des audaces, Payot, Lausanne, 1993, pp. 60–65 (et l'index, p. 431)
 Bertil Galland, Princes des marges, Ed. 24 heures / Coopérative Migros, Lausanne, 1991, chap. XIII

References

External links
 Marcel Regamey sur le Dictionnaire historique de la Suisse

1905 births
People from the canton of Vaud
1982 deaths
Swiss essayists
20th-century essayists
20th-century Swiss journalists